Sukhpal Singh Panesar (born December 26, 1993) is a Canadian field hockey player who plays as a midfielder for English club Beeston and the Canadian national team.

International career
He played for the Canada national field hockey team at the 2015 Pan American Games and won a silver medal. In 2016, he was named to Canada's Olympic team.

In June 2021, Panesar was named to Canada's 2020 Summer Olympics team.

References

External links
 
 
 
 
 

1993 births
Living people
Commonwealth Games competitors for Canada
Field hockey people from British Columbia
Male field hockey midfielders
Sportspeople from Surrey, British Columbia
Canadian sportspeople of Indian descent
Canadian people of Punjabi descent
Canadian male field hockey players
Pan American Games silver medalists for Canada
Field hockey players at the 2016 Summer Olympics
Field hockey players at the 2020 Summer Olympics
Olympic field hockey players of Canada
Pan American Games medalists in field hockey
Field hockey players at the 2014 Commonwealth Games
Field hockey players at the 2015 Pan American Games
Field hockey players at the 2018 Commonwealth Games
2018 Men's Hockey World Cup players
Field hockey players at the 2019 Pan American Games
Royal Racing Club Bruxelles players
Men's Belgian Hockey League players
HTC Uhlenhorst Mülheim players
Beeston Hockey Club players
Men's England Hockey League players
Medalists at the 2015 Pan American Games
Medalists at the 2019 Pan American Games